WHDC-LD, virtual and VHF digital channel 12, is a low-powered Court TV-affiliated television station licensed to Charleston, South Carolina, United States. The station is owned by Lowcountry 34 Media, LLC.

Digital television

Digital channels
The station's digital signal is multiplexed:

References

External links

HDC-LD
Low-power television stations in the United States
Television channels and stations established in 2001
2001 establishments in South Carolina